Jalandhara (Sanskrit: जलन्धर, lit. he who holds water), also known as Chalantarana (Sanskrit: चलन्तरण, lit. he who walks and swims) is an asura in Hinduism. He was born when Shiva opened his third eye in his fury when Indra struck him with his thunderbolt. However, Indra was saved, and the energy emitted from the eye was sent into the ocean. The energy developed into a boy and was raised by Varuna, and eventually, by Shukracharya. When he grew up, he conquered the three realms - Svarga (heaven), Bhuloka (earth), and Patala (underworld). He married Vrinda, the daughter of Kalanemi. He would be slain by his creator, Shiva.

Legend

Birth 
In the Shiva temple, when Indra and Brihaspati were going towards Mount Kailasha to meet Shiva, their way was blocked by a naked yogi with matted hair and a radiant face. The yogi was Shiva himself, who had taken the form to test the knowledge of Indra and Brihaspati. Indra did not recognize the yogi and was infuriated at the fact that the man was not moving out of their way. Indra asked him to move, but the man did not budge. After not receiving a response, Indra became enraged and threatened him with his thunderbolt. Upon this action Indra's arm, became paralysed and Shiva neutralised the thunderbolt. Shiva became angry upon this action of Indra and his eyes turned red, frightening Indra. The anger caused his third eye to open, nearly killing Indra. Brihaspati recognised Shiva and prayed to him, requesting him to pardon Indra. To avoid killing Indra, Shiva sent the fire from his eye towards the ocean and upon meeting with the ocean it assumed the form of a boy. The boy cried terribly, which caused Brahma to descend from his abode. The ocean told Brahma that he did not know where the boy came from. Brahma then told him that the boy would one day become the emperor of the asuras, that he could only be killed by Shiva, and that after his death, he would return to third eye.

Ascent to Power 
Jalandhara's childhood was full of wonders. Borne up by the wind, he flew over the ocean; his pets were lions that he had caught; and the largest birds and fishes were subject to him. Jalandhara grew up to be a handsome man and was made the emperor of asuras by Shukra, their guru. Jalandhara was exceedingly powerful and was considered to be one of the mightiest asuras of all time. He married Vrinda, the daughter of the asura Kalanemi. Jalandhara ruled with justice and nobility. One day, the sage Bhargava (Shukra) came to meet Jalandhara. He narrated the tales of Hiranyakashipu and Virochana. He also told him how Vishnu had severed Rahu's head during the episode of the Samudra Manthana. The asura came to believe that the devas had treacherously taken his father Varuna's treasures. He sent one of his messengers, Ghasmara, to Indra to ask him to return his father's treasures. However, Indra refused to do so.

A fierce battle ensued between the devas and the asuras. Many warriors were killed on both sides. Shukra revived the asuras using his amṛtajīvinī vidya. Brihaspati revived the dead devas by using the medicinal herbs from the Drona mountain. Shukra counselled Jalandhara to uproot the mountain so that Brihaspati would be unable to employ the medicinal herbs to revive the devas. Jalandhara acquiesced and hurled the mountain Drona into the ocean. Demoralised, the devas requested Vishnu for his aid. A fierce battle was fought between Jalandhara and Vishnu, who rode upon Garuda and wielded his divine sword, Nandaka. Vishnu was impressed by Jalandhara's valiance in battle and granted him a boon of his choice. Jalandhara requested his brother-in-law Vishnu to stay in his eponymous city, bringing with him his followers and his consort, Lakshmi. Without his help, the devas were defeated by asuras, and Jalandhara became the lord of the three worlds (heaven, earth, and the underworld). He confiscated all the jewels that the devas and the gandharvas had hoarded during the Samudra Manthana and ruled virtuously, with nobody in his realm sick or lean.

War with Shiva 
The devas were unhappy about their defeat, dejected at their being stripped of their authority. The divine sage, Narada, upon consulting with the devas, went to see Jalandhara. On being asked the purpose of his visit by Jalandhara, he described the beauty of Kailasha where Shiva lived, and that he wondered if any other place matched its beauty. In response, Jalandhara showed off his riches to Narada, who commented that he did not have the most beautiful woman as his wife. Narada then continued to describe Shiva's residence and also described to him about Parvati's beauty.

Jalandhara sent his messenger Rahu to Shiva and accused him of hypocrisy, pointing out that Shiva claimed to be an ascetic but kept a wife, Parvati. He proposed that Shiva hand over Parvati to him:
How can you live on alms and yet keep the beautiful Parvati? Give her to me, and wander from house to house with your alms bowl. You have fallen from your vow. You are a yogi, what need have you for the gem of wives? You live in the woods attended by goblins and ghosts; being a naked yogi, you should give your wife to one who will appreciate her better than you do.

Upon hearing these insults, Shiva became so angry that a fearsome creature (Kīrttimukha) sprang from his brow and nearly killed Rahu, the messenger who had delivered the demand. War being determined, Jalandhara marched first to Kailasha; but finding that Shiva had forsaken it and taken up a position on a mountain near Lake Manasa, he surrounded the mountain with his troops. Nandi marched against them, and spread destruction; however, the army of the gods suffered many losses. Parvati then urged Shiva to enter the war. Shiva carefully warned Parvati to be on her guard during his absence, as it was possible asuras in some disguise might visit her; after this, accompanied by Virabhadra and Manibhadra, two forms of his anger, Shiva went to the battlefield. Kartikeya came to fight with him, but was defeated. After his defeat, Ganesha tried to attack him, but was badly defeated by him and was left unconscious on the battlefield. Upon seeing Shiva and his avatars dominate the battlefield, Jalandhara created an illusion. This distracted his army, but not himself. Meanwhile, Jalandhara disguised himself as Shiva and went to Parvati in order to trick her. Parvati recognised him and fled, growing beyond infuriated. The goddess meditated on Vishnu, and when he appeared, she demanded that he deceive Vrinda, just like Jalandhara had tried to deceive her.

Vishnu caused Vrinda to dream that Jalandhara had been killed by Shiva. Posing as an ascetic, he creates the illusion that Jalandhara is then restored to life by him. Delighted to see her husband restored to life, Vrinda sported with him for many days in the forest. She recognised that it was Vishnu in disguise, and curses him that someday someone would trick his own wife (which becomes true when Sita is kidnapped by Ravana) just like how he had tricked her, that he would roam about in distress with Shesha (Lakshmana), and that he would seek the help of monkeys (vanaras). Saying thus, she entered the fire to immolate herself. After her death, her soul left her form from the funeral pyre, joining Parvati.

Death 
Jalandhara, hearing of this deception and his wife's death, was enraged and left Mount Kailasha, returning to the battlefield. The illusion ending, Shiva and his forces realised the truth. Shiva engaged Sumbha and Nisumbha in battle, but they soon fled. They were later killed by Parvati. Jalandhara then engaged Shiva in battle. Towards the end of the battle, when most of Jalandhara's army had been slaughtered, Shiva beheaded him with a chakra (discus) created from his toe. Upon his death, his soul merged with Shiva, just like Vrinda's soul had merged with his consort.

References

Shaivism
Daityas
Danavas